Cassina Valsassina (Valassinese ) is a town and comune in the province of Lecco, in Lombardy.

References

Cities and towns in Lombardy
Valsassina